Żeleźnica may refer to the following places:
Żeleźnica, Greater Poland Voivodeship (west-central Poland)
Żeleźnica, Łódź Voivodeship (central Poland)
Żeleźnica, Świętokrzyskie Voivodeship (south-central Poland)
Żeleźnica, Lubusz Voivodeship (west Poland)